The Seventeenth Amendment of the Constitution Act 1997 amended the Constitution of Ireland to provide that the confidentiality of meetings of the cabinet would not prevent the High Court from ordering that certain information be disclosed when this was in the public interest. It was approved by referendum on 30 October 1997 and signed into law on 14 November of the same year.

Changes to the text
Inserted a new subsection in Article 28.4:

The existing subsection 3º of Article 28.4 was renumbered as subsection 4º.

Overview
In 1992, during the Beef Tribunal, the Supreme Court ruled that, as the constitution stood, the confidentiality of meetings of the Government (the cabinet) was unbreachable and absolute. The court derived its ruling from Article 28.4.2º, which requires that the Government observe the principle of collective responsibility. The purpose of the Seventeenth Amendment was to allow cabinet confidentiality to be relaxed in certain circumstances.

The amendment was adopted during the Fianna Fáil–Progressive Democrats coalition government led by Bertie Ahern but had been first drafted and suggested by the previous Fine Gael–Labour Party–Democratic Left government led by John Bruton. The amendment, therefore, had the support of all major parties. The referendum occurred on the same day as the 1997 presidential election.

Result

See also
Cabinet (government)
Politics of the Republic of Ireland
History of the Republic of Ireland
Constitutional amendment

References

External links
Seventeenth Amendment of the Constitution Act 1997
Seventeenth Amendment of the Constitution (No. 2) Bill 1997, includes Oireachtas debates
Full text of the Constitution of Ireland

1997 in Irish law
1997 in Irish politics
1997 referendums
17
Classified information
17
October 1997 events in Europe
Amendment, 17